Płużnica Wielka  is a village in the administrative district of Gmina Strzelce Opolskie, within Strzelce County, Opole Voivodeship, in south-western Poland.

It was the birthplace, in 1824, of Fr. Leopold Moczygemba, who led the migration that founded the Polish settlements of Panna Maria and Bandera, Texas.

References

Villages in Strzelce County